Centrès is a commune in the Aveyron department in southern France.

Geography
The river Céor forms most of the commune's southeastern and southern borders, then flows (at Saint-Just-sur-Viaur) into the Viaur, which forms all of its western and northern borders.

Population

See also
Communes of the Aveyron department

References

Communes of Aveyron
Aveyron communes articles needing translation from French Wikipedia